Sandhoe is a hamlet and civil parish in Northumberland, England. It lies about 3 kilometres (2 mi) northwest of Corbridge and 3 kilometres south of Hadrian's Wall. The parish touches Acomb, Corbridge, Hexham and Wall.

History 
The name "Sandhoe" means 'Sandy hill-spur'. Sandhoe is a deserted medieval village, the village was first recorded in the 13th century but by 1769 it had completely disappeared and is now covered by modern housing. Sandhoe was formerly a township in the parish of St. John-Lee, in 1866 Sandhoe became a civil parish in its own right.

Landmarks 
Listed buildings in the township include Beaufront Castle and Sandhoe Hall.

References

External links

Villages in Northumberland
Civil parishes in Northumberland